Vesoul station (French: Gare de Vesoul) is the railway station serving the commune of Vesoul, in the Haute-Saône department of eastern France.

Services

The station is served by regional trains towards Lure, Belfort, Culmont-Chalindrey and Paris.

References

Vesoul
Railway stations in Haute-Saône